Kenneth Josiah Omeruo (born 17 October 1993) is a Nigerian professional footballer who plays as a defender and the captain for Segunda División club Leganés and the Nigeria national team. Omeruo signed for Chelsea from Standard Liège in January 2012 and upon signing went on loan to Dutch top-flight side ADO Den Haag.
Then only 19, he impressed enough in the Eredivisie to earn a call up to the Nigerian national team.

Now a regular international, Omeruo has represented Nigeria at the 2013 Africa Cup of Nations and the 2013 Confederations Cup in Brazil. Omeruo cemented a place in the starting line-up at the Africa Cup of Nations as it turned into a wonderful tournament for the Super Eagles and they emerged from the tournament victorious. In 2019 he scored his first goal in the Africa Cup of Nations against Guinea. He was a key part of the Super Eagles team that won the bronze medal in 2019.

Club career

Early career
Omeruo had spells at Sunshine Stars and Anderlecht as a trialist before he was signed from the Anderlecht academy by Standard Liège.

Chelsea
In January 2012, Chelsea signed Omeruo from Liège and immediately loaned him out to Eredivisie club ADO Den Haag. In May 2014 Nigeria World Cup-bound Omeruo agreed a new three-year contract with Chelsea.

Loan to ADO Den Haag
Omeruo joined ADO Den Haag on an 18-month loan deal which kept him at the club until the end of the 2012–13 season. On 3 March 2012, Omeruo made his debut for ADO Den Haag against SC Heerenveen which ended in a 0–0 draw. On 19 April 2012, in a game against FC Groningen Omeruo scored his first goal for ADO Den Haag.

On 28 April 2012, Omeruo scored against VVV-Venlo in the 19th minute. He is the only player in the Dutch league ever to score a goal, an own goal and receive a red card in one match.

Loan to Middlesbrough
On 7 January 2014, Omeruo joined Middlesbrough on loan until the end of the 2013–14 season. On 1 February 2014, Omeruo made his debut for Middlesbrough in a 0–0 draw against Doncaster Rovers. On 8 April 2014, Omeruo was sent off in the 82nd minute after picking up a second yellow. Although Boro had to finish the game with 9-men (Ben Gibson was also sent off late in the game), they still managed to earn a 3–1 win victory against Birmingham City.

He rejoined Middlesbrough for the 2014–15 season, making his first appearance against Birmingham in a 2-0 win.

Loan to Kasımpaşa
On 21 July 2015, Omeruo joined Kasımpaşa on a season-long loan with an option to purchase the player at the end of the spell. On 16 August 2015, Omeruo made his debut for Kasımpaşa in a match against Gaziantepspor, the match ended in a 3–0 victory for Kasımpaşa. Five days later,  Omeruo made his home debut against İstanbul Başakşehir F.K. which ended in a 1–0 victory for Kasımpaşa.

Omeruo had an up and down season, suffering from a couple injuries, however started whenever he was fit. Although the loan deal had an option to buy, Kasımpaşa decided to pass on the option due to a lack of funds, which led to Omeruo returning to Chelsea for pre-season.

Loan to Alanyaspor
On 31 August 2016, Omeruo signed a one-year contract extension until 2019, before leaving on loan again. He joined Alanyaspor on a season-long loan. He was given the number 44. On 10 September 2016, Omeruo made his debut in a 0–0 draw against Gençlerbirliği. On 25 February 2017, Omeruo scored his first goal for Alanyaspor in their 4–1 home victory over Adanaspor, netting in the hosts' second in the 37th minute.

In May 2017, Omeruo said he might have to leave Chelsea in order to play regular first-team football.

Return to Kasımpaşa
On 25 August 2017, after signing a new three-year deal at Chelsea, Omeruo returned to Kasımpaşa on a season-long loan.

Leganés
On 15 August 2018, Omeruo joined CD Leganés on a season-long loan. In October 2018 he stated that he was enjoying playing in Spain, and in March 2019 he said he wanted to sign for Leganés permanently.

On 13 August 2019, Omeruo returned to Leganés, this time on a permanent deal, ending his seven year spell at Chelsea.

International career

Omeruo played for the Nigerian Under-20 team that reached the quarter-finals at the 2011 FIFA U-20 World Cup in Colombia.

On 9 January 2013, at the age of 19 he played for the senior team for the first time in a goalless draw against Cape Verde. He then went on to play in all of Nigeria's matches at the 2013 Africa Cup of Nations as Nigeria went on to win the competition for the third time.

Later that year he was selected for Nigeria's squad at the 2013 FIFA Confederations Cup and played in all of the three group games as Nigeria finished third in their group.

Omeuro was named in Nigeria's final squad for the 2014 FIFA World Cup and started in all four games as Nigeria finished second in their group and were eliminated by France at the Round of 16.

He was selected by Nigeria for their 35-man provisional squad for the 2016 Summer Olympics, but did not make the final 18- man squad.

In May 2018 he was named in Nigeria's preliminary 30 man squad for the 2018 FIFA World Cup in Russia.

Playing style
Omeruo has been described as a "tall, rangy but strong centre-back" and a "level-headed and determined youngster".

Personal life
His younger brother Lucky Omeruo is also a footballer,  who currently plays for CD Leganés B. as a striker and for the Nigeria national under-20 football team.

Omeruo and his wife Chioma have welcomed their first child in London, a girl named Chairein.

Career statistics

Club

International

International goals

Honours
Nigeria
Africa Cup of Nations: 2013
Africa Cup of Nations third place: 2019

References

External links

1993 births
Living people
Nigerian footballers
Nigeria under-20 international footballers
Nigeria international footballers
Association football defenders
Chelsea F.C. players
Middlesbrough F.C. players
ADO Den Haag players
Kasımpaşa S.K. footballers
Alanyaspor footballers
CD Leganés players
Eredivisie players
English Football League players
Süper Lig players
La Liga players
Nigerian expatriate footballers
Expatriate footballers in England
Expatriate footballers in the Netherlands
Expatriate footballers in Turkey
Expatriate footballers in Spain
2013 Africa Cup of Nations players
2013 FIFA Confederations Cup players
2014 FIFA World Cup players
Nigerian expatriate sportspeople in England
Nigerian expatriate sportspeople in the Netherlands
Nigerian expatriate sportspeople in Turkey
Africa Cup of Nations-winning players
Sportspeople from Abia State
2018 FIFA World Cup players
2019 Africa Cup of Nations players
2021 Africa Cup of Nations players